FC Soualiga is a football club based in Philipsburg, Sint Maarten. Its men's team competes in the Sint Maarten Senior League. It is mostly known for its women's team.

History

Women
Receiving jerseys just before the 2013 International Women’s Soccer Tournament, which they hosted, FC Soualiga came first in the 2014 second edition and were rhapsodized for their professionalism and organization as well.

Sponsors
 Princess Juliana International Airport

Former players
  Kandice Franklyn

References

Football clubs in Sint Maarten